Mariam Gigolashvili is a Georgian acrobatic gymnast. With partners Nino Diasamidze and Magda Rusia, Gigolashvili competed in the 2014 Acrobatic Gymnastics World Championships.

References

1994 births
Living people
Acrobatic gymnasts from Georgia (country)
Female acrobatic gymnasts
Sportswomen from Georgia (country)